Israa Jaabis (born 22 July 1986) is a Palestinian prisoner who has been imprisoned in Israel since 2015.

Car explosion incident
On Oct. 11, 2015, Israa Jaabis, 31, was en route to her home in Jerusalem, about 500 meters away from the A-Zaim checkpoint in Jerusalem's eastern suburbs on the road from Ma'aleh Adumim [מַעֲלֵה אֲדֻמִּים]. Stopped by a police office for suspicious driving, she exited the vehicle.

"The driver then shouted 'Allah Hu Akbar' ([الله أكبر] God is great) and detonated an explosive device," a police spokeswoman said. The rigged cooking gas cylinder inside the car caused the vehicle to burst into flames.

Security forces found hand-written notes in her possession that contained messages of support for "martyrs," a euphemism for those killed in the commission of a terrorist act. 

A year later, following trial and conviction, Jaabis was sentenced to 11 years in prison.

Meeting son
Israa Jaabis has one son, Mutasem Jaabis, 11 (as of 2020), whom his aunt Muna Jaabis takes care of. She claims Mutasem is denied access to his mother by the State is Israel and is unable to visit his mother at regular intervals in Israel's northern HaSharon Prison. One special meeting was arranged by the Red Cross between the mother and son after a year and a half in Israeli custody after several futile attempts, the aunt says.

In popular culture

Jaabis's story was featured in a documentary film Advocate in 2019.

References

Living people
1986 births
Palestinian prisoners and detainees